Aesculus × carnea, or red horse-chestnut, is a medium-sized tree, an artificial hybrid between A. pavia (red buckeye) and A. hippocastanum (horse-chestnut). Its origin uncertain, probably appearing in Germany before 1820. It is a popular tree in large gardens and parks.

Aesculus × carnea'''s features are typically intermediate between the parent species, but it inherits the red flower color from A. pavia''. Its showy flowers are borne in plumes on branch ends, blooming in spring and producing leathery fruit capsules in fall. Its leaves are dark green, palmately compound, and deciduous, each leaf divided into five large, toothed leaflets.

Cultivars
 'Briotii' (named in 1858 to honor Pierre Louis Briot (1804-1888), the chief horticulturist of the State gardens at Trianon-Versailles near Paris, France) This is the most commonly seen cultivar which has 10-inch tall, deep rosy flowers and matures as a smaller tree.
 'O'Neil', which produce larger (10–12 inch) panicles with brighter red flowers.
 'Fort McNair' (named from where it was selected) it has dark pink flowers with yellow throats and resists leaf scorch and leaf blotch.
 'Pendula' with arching branches.
 'Plantierensis' which has intense rose pink flowers with yellow throats and does not set fruit, which makes it less messy.

References

Flora of Europe
carnea
Interspecific plant hybrids